Trevor Hoyte (born May 30, 1998) is a professional Canadian football linebacker for the Toronto Argonauts of the Canadian Football League (CFL).

University career
Following his college career with the John Abbott College Islanders, Hoyte played U Sports football for the Carleton Ravens from 2017 to 2019. He played in 22 regular season games where he had 75 tackles, six tackles for a loss, 4.5 sacks, and two interceptions. He did not play in 2020 due to the cancellation of the 2020 U Sports football season and remained draft-eligible for the Canadian Football League in 2021.

Professional career
Hoyte was drafted in the fourth round, 33rd overall, in the 2021 CFL Draft by the Toronto Argonauts and signed with the team on May 13, 2021. He made the team following training camp and played in his first career professional game on August 7, 2021, against the Calgary Stampeders. He was featured heavily on defence on September 17, 2021, due to an injury to Cameron Judge, where he made his first six career defensive tackles in a game against the Saskatchewan Roughriders. Following a number of injuries to other players, Hoyte made his first career start, at middle linebacker, on October 11, 2021, against the Hamilton Tiger-Cats, where he had five defensive tackles.

Personal life
Hoyte's father played football for the Wilfrid Laurier Golden Hawks and Hoyte's sister was a U Sports All-Canadian in Rugby for the Concordia Stingers. Hoyte majored in astrophysics while attending Carleton University.

References

External links
Toronto Argonauts bio 

1998 births
Living people
Canadian football linebackers
Carleton Ravens football players
Players of Canadian football from Quebec
Sportspeople from Gatineau
Toronto Argonauts players